The New Variety is an American cabaret created and produced by Thomas Goodman and Richard O'Donnell. It was a fast-paced, ever-changing volley of acts that included jugglers, fire-eaters, stand-up comics, singers, musicians, and sketch comedy troupes. It was hailed by June Sawyer of the Chicago Tribune as a cabaret for the '90s.

History
In February 1992, producers Thomas Goodman (founder of CrossCurrents Cabaret) and R. O’Donnell (co-founder of New Age Vaudeville) teamed up to present the New Variety, located at 400 N. Clark, downtown Chicago. Modeled after the vaudeville variety shows of the ‘20s and '30s, the New Variety presented an evening’s worth of acts that included jugglers, fire-eaters, comics, singers, musicians, and sketch comedy troupes.

Venues

New Variety Cabaret

The original location of the New Variety was the upstairs of the Italian restaurant Bellagio.  Built specifically for the show, the cabaret was an elegant and intimate 100-seat theater, revealing a sophisticated art deco-style decor. The audience sat at round black tables with green and black chairs around a small black-and-white checkered stage, slightly raised.

Hailed by the June Sawyer of the Chicago Tribune as a Cabaret for the 90s. the bill included artistic director and host Richard O'Donnell (billed as "R."), jazz band the Vince Willis Trio, juggler extraordinaire Andy Head, drummer Donny DeMarco Jr., tap dancer Ayrie King, stand-up comedy by John Tamborino, and Saxophonist Sarah Underwood, followed by a crowning performance by the incomparable blues chanteuse Barbara LeShoure.

Improv Comedy Club

In August, 1993, the New Variety moved to the Chicago Improv, (504 N. Wells) and was responsible for changing a faltering 3-ring comedy presentation into a successful variety format. The New Variety now offered a more streamlined, commercial show. Acts included artistic director & host R. O’Donnell, stand-up comics such as Paul Gilmartin (Dinner and a movie, host), Kevin Rogers, and Steve Seagren and sketch comedy troupes including the all-girl Nude Coffee, the all-gay The Boys in the Bathroom, and the all-improv The Upright Citizens Brigade. Dr. Boom (who literally blew things up on stage) was the highlight of the evening.

The Chicago Improv was a 400-seat theater whereby audience members sat at long tables in a room about the size of your high school cafeteria. Scott Seigel re-designed the original look of the stage to accommodate the New Variety's edgier feel.

Regular Acts

Boys in the Bathroom 
Matt Besser
Upright Citizens Brigade (Matt Besser, Ian Roberts, Ali Farahnakian, Adam McKay, Rick Roman, and Horatio Sanz)
Dr. Boom 
Nude Coffee 
Ectomorph (Darren Bodeker, Bart Heird and Jim Kopsian)
Andy Head 
Ayrie "Mr. Taps" King 
R. O'Donnell (host)
Kevin Rogers 
Steve Seagren 
The Sound (A cappella group), Paul Mabin, Greg Vaden, Kevin Kent and Keevin Peuse 
John Tamborino 
Obediah Thomas 
Vince Willis Trio
Sarah Underwood

References 

American comedy troupes
Theatre companies in Chicago
Theatres in Chicago